Edward Banfield may refer to:
 Edward Banfield (railroad engineer) (1837–1872), British railroad engineer in Argentina
 Edward C. Banfield (1916–1999), American political scientist